Volans is a constellation in the southern sky. It represents a flying fish; its name is a shortened form of its original name, Piscis Volans. Volans was one of twelve constellations created by Petrus Plancius from the observations of Pieter Dirkszoon Keyser and Frederick de Houtman and it first appeared on a 35-cm diameter celestial globe published in 1597 (or 1598) in Amsterdam by Plancius with Jodocus Hondius. The first depiction of this constellation in a celestial atlas was in Johann Bayer's Uranometria of 1603.

History

Volans is one of the 12 constellations that were introduced by the Dutch navigators Pieter Dirkszoon Keyser and Frederick de Houtman in the late 16th century. It was first depicted on Petrus Plancius’ globe in 1598. Plancius called the constellation Vliegendenvis (flying fish).

In 1603, Johann Bayer included the constellation in his star atlas Uranometria under the name Piscis Volans, the flying fish. John Herschel proposed shrinking the name to one word in 1844, noting that Lacaille himself had abbreviated his constellations thus on occasion. This was universally adopted.

Volans represents a type of tropical fish that can jump out of the water and glide through the air on wings. In early celestial maps, the flying fish was often depicted as accompanying the ship Argo Navis, and being chased by the predatory fish represented by the adjoining constellation Dorado.

Features

Stars

There are two double stars within the constellation which can be observed using a small telescope, Gamma Volantis and Epsilon Volantis, along with two galaxies which may be more difficult to see clearly, NGC 2442 and NGC 2434. The magnitudes of the Gamma Volantis stars are 3.8 and 5.6, and of Epsilon Volantis 4.4 and 7.3.

The Astronomical Society of Southern Africa in 2003 reported that observations of the variable stars R and S Volantis in Volans were very urgently needed as data on their light curves was incomplete.

HD 76700 is a sunlike star some 195 light-years distant that has been found to have a planet.

Deep-sky objects
Volans has several deep-sky objects within its borders.

The Lindsay-Shapley ring, also categorized as AM0644-741, is a ring galaxy located 300 million light-years from Earth. Named for its discoverers, the Lindsay-Shapley ring was found near the Large Magellanic Cloud in 1960. Like the Cartwheel Galaxy in Sculptor, the unusual shape of this galaxy results from a collision many millions of years ago. The blue ring, 150,000 light-years in diameter, was formed when a shock wave from the collision created a ring of hot blue stars; the yellow core is an amalgamation of the progenitors' cores. NGC 2442, an intermediate-spiral galaxy, is also located in this constellation, with a distance of 50 million light-years from Earth.

Graham's Object, aka Das Rheingold or Nibelungen Ring is a ring shaped galaxy at R.A. 6h 41.4m / Decl. -74° 19' (2000.0) in Volans

See also
 IAU-recognized constellations
 Volans (Chinese astronomy)

References

Sources

External links 
 The Deep Photographic Guide to the Constellations: Volans
 The clickable Volans

 
Southern constellations
Constellations listed by Petrus Plancius
Dutch celestial cartography in the Age of Discovery
Astronomy in the Dutch Republic
1590s in the Dutch Republic